Events in the year 2011 in Serbia.

Incumbents
President: Boris Tadić
Prime Minister: Mirko Cvetković

Events
 2011 Serbian census took place.

January 
 Bosniak Academy of Sciences and Arts was founded in Sarajevo, Bosnia and Herzegovina and Sandžak

April 
 April 4: Serbian pro-Western President Boris Tadić resigned, paving the way for early presidential election where he will face strong challenge from a nationalist candidate.

May 
 May 26: Ratko Mladić, the war crimes fugitive accused of orchestrating the Siege of Sarajevo and the Srebrenica massacre, has been arrested in Serbia.

July 
 July 20: Goran Hadžić is detained in Serbia, becoming the last of 161 people indicted by the International Criminal Tribunal for the former Yugoslavia.
 July 25 - North Kosovo crisis started on Kosovo.

December 
 Paul Karađorđević, prince and regent of the Kingdom of Yugoslavia was rehabilitated.

Arts and entertainment
In music: Serbia in the Eurovision Song Contest 2011.

Sports
Football (soccer) competitions: Serbian SuperLiga, Serbian Cup. 

 2011 UEFA European Under-17 Football Championship

 EuroBelgrade, a student sports event organized by the University of Belgrade, was held for the first time.

Deaths

January 
 January 10 – Bora Kostić, 80, Serbian footballer (Red Star Belgrade).
 January 23 – Novica Tadić, 62, Yugoslavian poet.

March 
 March 23 – Živorad Kovačević, 80, Serbian diplomat.

April 
 April 12 – Aleksandar Petaković, 81, Serbian football player.  (Serbian)

References

 
Serbia
Years of the 21st century in Serbia